Prévot  is a French surname that may refer to:
 André Romain Prévot (1894–1982), French bacteriologist
 Charles-Victor Prévot, vicomte d'Arlincourt (1788–1856), French novelist
 Pauline Ferrand-Prévot (born 1992), French cyclist
 Prévôt, government official of the Ancien Régime (provost)

Seel also
Provost (name)

French-language surnames